Richard Johann Dunn (5 September 1943 – 4 August 1998) was a British television executive who served as the Chief Executive Officer of Thames Television.

References

1943 births
1998 deaths
International Emmy Founders Award winners
British television executives
British chief executives
Chief executives in the media industry